HNLMS Van Meerlant (ML 36) was a minelayer of the Royal Netherlands Navy built in the Gusto shipyard at Schiedam as part of the Douwe Aukes class.

Service
On the general mobilisation of the Dutch military on 28 August 1939, Van Meerlant was deployed to lay minefields, including ones at IJmuiden and the Hook of Holland. She sailed for the United Kingdom from Vlissingen alongside the gunboat Flores, arriving on 18 May 1940. She was first stationed at Falmouth, alongside her sister ship Douwe Aukes and the Dutch ship Medusa. Later that year Van Meerlant was posted to Chatham and assigned to the Thames Local Defence Flotilla, responsible for maintaining the boom defences in the Thames Estuary. On 14 March she was transferred to the Royal Navy, retaining her name as HMS Van Meerlant. She was sunk on 4 June 1941 by a mine, with 42 hands killed.

Notes

Sources
Mark, C. Schepen van de Koninklijke Marine in W.O. II Alkmaar: De Alk bv, 1997 94-103

Douwe Aukes-class minelayers
1920 ships
World War II minelayers of the Netherlands
Minelayers of the Royal Navy
Ships sunk by mines
World War II shipwrecks in the North Sea
Maritime incidents in June 1941
Ships built by Gusto Shipyard